The Fall Creek Meeting House is a historic Quaker meeting house located approximately  east of Pendleton, Indiana, United States, on State Road 38 in Fall Creek Township, Madison County, Indiana.

History
Adamson was paid $15 for the land. In 1836 the congregation built a log house for worship on the ground. In 1857, a frame meeting house was constructed at a cost of $800. The meeting house is representative of the rural meeting houses of the period. The building is still maintained and a pioneer cemetery adjoins the meeting house.

It was listed in the National Register of Historic Places in 1997.

References

External links
 Aerial View - https://web.archive.org/web/20070927191908/http://www.archiplanet.org/wiki/Fall_Creek_Meeting_House
 Cemeteries in Madison County Indiana - http://www.cemeteries-madison-co-in.com/friends_cemetery.htm

Pendleton, Indiana
Churches on the National Register of Historic Places in Indiana
Religious buildings and structures completed in 1857
Buildings and structures in Madison County, Indiana
National Register of Historic Places in Madison County, Indiana
1836 establishments in Indiana